The 2019 South and Central American Women's Club Handball Championship is the first edition of the South and Central American Women's Club Handball Championship, took place in Concórdia, Brazil from 12 to 16 March 2019. It acts as the South and Central American qualifying tournament for the 2019 IHF Women's Super Globe.

Standings

Results
All times are local (UTC−3).

References

External links
CBHb official website

South and Central American Women's Club Handball Championship
South and Central American Women's Club Handball Championship
South
South and Central American Women's Club Handball
South and Central American Women's Club Handball Championship